Friedle Olivier (born 27 May 1992) is a professional South African rugby union player for the Enisei-STM in the Rugby Premier League. His regular position is as a number eight, but he played as a flanker and a lock earlier in his career.

Career

Olivier earned his first provincial selection when he was included in the Blue Falcons side that played at the Under-18 Academy Week tournament in 2010. After high school, he fell in with the ' youth structures and made five appearances for the  side in Group B of the 2011 Under-19 Provincial Championship, helping them reach the semi-finals of the competition.

In 2012, he made three starts for the s in the 2012 Under-21 Provincial Championship, scoring two tries in their match against s in a 31–27 victory.

He appeared as a replacement in their remaining four matches of the competition as they finished in seventh position on the Northern Section log to miss out on a quarter final berth.

He started all seven of their matches and scored eight tries; he scored in six of their matches and got two tries against both  and the s to finish the season as the Falcons U21s' top scorer.

He made six appearances in the 2014 Vodacom Cup as the Falcons won one match out of seven to finish in seventh position on the Northern Section and a further three appearances in the 2014 Currie Cup qualification competition, where teams competed for a spot in the 2014 Currie Cup Premier Division. The Falcons finished in sixth spot to remain in the 2014 Currie Cup First Division. The Falcons finished fourth on the log to qualify for the semi-finals; Olivier was not involved in their 31–24 victory over a  team that finished top of the log or the final, where the Falcons lost 21–23 to the Griffons in Welkom.

Statistics

Honours

 Russian Championships (2): 2020-21, 2021-22
 Russian Cup (2): 2020, 2021
 Nikolaev Cup (2): 2021, 2022

References

South African rugby union players
Living people
1992 births
Rugby union players from Pretoria
Rugby union locks
Rugby union flankers
Rugby union number eights
Falcons (rugby union) players
Yenisey-STM Krasnoyarsk players
Cheetahs (rugby union) players
Free State Cheetahs players